Marsden Point is a broad, flat peninsula that is the southern head of the Whangārei Harbour entrance on the east coast of Northland, New Zealand,  southeast of the city of Whangārei. It is the location of Marsden Point Oil Refinery and the Northport cargo port.

Geography 
The point is a broad, flat barrier spit, a peninsula of sand dunes, alluvium and estuarine deposits, that forms the southern head of the Whangārei Harbour entrance. The flat, developed terrain contrasts starkly with the forest-covered peaks and pinnacles of the mountains across the channel on the northern head, including the 420-metre Mount Manaia. The point is at the northern end of the 22-kilometre long Bream Bay, which has mostly white-sand beaches. Easy access to beaches and recreational fishing grounds, with a climate of warm summers and mild winters, make the area a popular holiday spot and residential location. It is in the Whangarei District and the Northland Region local government areas.

The Greater Marsden Point Area extends from One Tree Point, within Whangārei Harbour, to just south of the Ruakākā township on the open coast, an area of some 2,500 hectares.

People 

The tangata whenua Māori people are the Patuharakeke hapu, whose rohe (area) stretches on the seaward side from a point at the north of Mangawhai Heads to the mouth of the Mangapai River, just south of Whangārei.

Industry
Marsden Point Oil Refinery, the country’s only oil refinery, opened on the tip of the point in 1964, with its jetty in the harbour entrance channel. Northport, the main cargo port for Northland, is further up the channel, beside the refinery, and opened in 2002. A Carter Holt Harvey laminated veneer lumber factory, built in 2001, is just to the south-west of the refinery. The Marsden A and Marsden B oil-fired power stations were built near Ruakākā in the 1960s and 1970s, and dismantled in 2011–2012. A Marsden Point Branch railway is proposed to be built from the North Auckland Line to Northport.

References

Peninsulas of the Northland Region
Whangarei District
Populated places in the Northland Region